The Legkij Tank Provornova (LTP) is a light tank designed by Lieutenant K. J. Provornov in July 1942. Blueprints for the LTP were discovered in the Main Automotive-Armoured Directorate of the Ministry of Defence of the Russian Federation inventions department, but no prototypes have ever been made.

See also
 Spähpanzer SP I.C.
 T-46 (tank)
 Tanks in World War II

References

World War II light tanks
World War II tanks of the Soviet Union
Light tanks of the Soviet Union